Forever Free can refer to:
 Forever Free (non-fiction) or Forever Free: Elsa's Pride, third in the Born Free series of books written by Joy Adamson, published in 1962
 Forever Free (novel), a science fiction novel by Joe Haldeman, published in 1999
 Forever Free (Saxon album), an album by heavy metal band Saxon, released in 1992
 Forever Free (sculpture), a sculpture created by Edmonia Lewis in 1867
 "Forever Free" (W.A.S.P. song), a song by the heavy metal band W.A.S.P
 "Forever Free" (Stratovarius song), a song by Stratovarius from the album Visions